Anton-Günther, Duke of Oldenburg (Anton-Günther Friedrich August Wilhelm Josias von Holstein-Gottorp, Erbgroßherzog von Oldenburg, Prinz von Lübeck; 16 January 1923 – 20 September 2014) was the head of the Grand Ducal Family of Oldenburg.

Life 
He was born in Lensahn the son of Hereditary Grand Duke Nikolaus of Oldenburg (1897–1970) and his first wife Princess Helena of Waldeck and Pyrmont (1899–1948). Duke Anton-Günther was a grandson of Frederick Augustus II, the last Grand Duke of Oldenburg, and through his mother a grandson of Friedrich, the last Prince of Waldeck and Pyrmont.

He studied for a Diploma in Forestry and succeeded as head of the Grand Ducal Family of Oldenburg upon the death of his father, the Hereditary Grand Duke, on 3 April 1970. He died in September 2014 aged 91.

The ancestral home of the House of Oldenburg is Oldenburg castle, nowadays a museum owned by the state. Private seats of the Duke of Oldenburg are Rastede Palace near Oldenburg and Güldenstein Manor, Harmsdorf, in Schleswig-Holstein. Eutin Castle in Schleswig-Holstein is a museum owned by a family foundation set up by Duke Anton-Günther.  

According to his obituary issued by the family his ancestral titles (however not all part of his official German surname) were: HRH The Duke of Oldenburg, Heir in Norway, Duke of Schleswig, Holstein, Stormarn, Dithmarschen and Oldenburg, Prince of Lübeck and Birkenfeld, Lord of Jever and Knyphausen.

Marriage and children
Duke Anton-Günther was married to Princess Ameli of Löwenstein-Wertheim-Freudenberg (1923-2016) at Kreuzwertheim on 7 August 1951. They have two children:

Duchess Helene Elisabeth Bathildis Margarete of Oldenburg (born 3 August 1953 in Rastede), unmarried
Duke Christian Nikolaus Udo Peter of Oldenburg (born 1 February 1955 in Rastede), married to Countess Caroline zu Rantzau and has issue

The Duke and the Duchess lived at Güldenstein Manor, Harmsdorf, Schleswig Holstein. The Duke also owned Eutin Castle and Rastede Castle.

Ancestry

See also
Counts, dukes and grand dukes of Oldenburg

References

1923 births
2014 deaths
People from Ostholstein
Dukes of Oldenburg
Pretenders
Officers Crosses of the Order of Merit of the Federal Republic of Germany
Burials at the Ducal Mausoleum, Gertrudenfriedhof (Oldenburg)